Liceo San José del Carmen is a Chilean high school located in the rural area of El Huique in Palmilla, Colchagua Province, Chile.

References 

Educational institutions with year of establishment missing
Secondary schools in Chile
Schools in Colchagua Province